It Will Stay Between Us is a 2003 Slovak-Czech feature film, directed by Miroslav Šindelka. The film starred Tomáš Hanák, Danica Jurčová and Michal Dlouhý.

Cast
Tomáš Hanák as Tomáš
Danica Jurčová as Danica
Michal Dlouhý as Michal
Anna Šišková as Anna
Božidara Turzonovová as Danica's mother
Jozef Lenci as Danica's father
Zdena Studenková as interpreter
Ľubomír Paulovič as interpreter's boyfriend
Miroslav Noga as Šimon
Szidi Tobias as Lea
Michal Gučík as opera singer
Zuzana Fialová as opera singer's girlfriend
Matej Landl as Maťo
Zuzana Belohorcová as call girl
Radim Uzel as psychiatrist
František Kovár as priest
Rastislav Piško as real estate agent
Jaroslav Bekr as Jarko
Marek Vašut as detective
Marián Varga as organist
Radoslav Brzobohatý as car accident's victim
Hana Štěpánková as waitress

Additional credits
 Dušan Kojnok - architect
 Vladimír Illiť - sound
 Oľga Detaryová - supervising producer
 Darina Šuranová - costume designer
 Brani Gröhling - makeup artist
 Jiří Klenka - mix
 Pavel Štverák - sound consultant
 Jaroslav Bekr - choreographer

Awards

References

External links

2003 films
Slovak drama films
Slovak-language films
Czech romantic drama films
2000s Czech-language films